Springfield Township is one of twenty-one townships in LaPorte County, Indiana. As of the 2010 census, its population was 4,045 and it contained 1,914 housing units.

Springfield Township was established in 1835.

Geography

Communities in the township include the incorporated town of Michiana Shores and the unincorporated community of Springville.

References

External links
 Indiana Township Association
 United Township Association of Indiana

Townships in LaPorte County, Indiana
Townships in Indiana